Andrena apicata   is a Palearctic species of mining bee.

References

External links
Images representing Andrena apicata 

Hymenoptera of Europe
apicata
Insects described in 1847